EMFF may refer to:
 Electromagnetic formation flight
 the European Maritime and Fisheries Fund, a previous name of the European Maritime, Fisheries and Aquaculture Fund